A Terra Prometida (English: The Promised Land) is a Brazilian telenovela produced by Casablanca and broadcast by RecordTV. It premiered on July 5, 2016 and ended on March 13, 2017. It tells the story of the biblical character Joshua.

Synopsis
The series takes place in approximately 1200 B.C in a Hebrew camp in Shittim, in the desert of Moab. After the death of Moses, Joshua becomes the new leader of the Hebrews. Joshua is an experienced warrior, endowed with courage, determination, and a powerful faith. But it is no easy task to lead a people to their destination. With his closest and trusted allies, (the Levite priest Eleazar and Caleb, who is the leader of the tribe of Judah) Joshua has to fulfill a difficult mission, one ordained by God: to command the twelve tribes of Israel and lead them in their conquest of Canaan, the Promised Land.

Cast

Broadcast 
The telenovela aired from July 5, 2016 to March 13, 2017 at 8:30 p.m. (BRT/AMT).

In the United States it aired on Univision from August 7, 2017 to September 8, 2017 and on September 11, 2017 it moved to sister channel UniMás due to low ratings.

Ratings

Brazil

References

External links
  
 

2016 telenovelas
Television series based on the Bible
Brazilian telenovelas
RecordTV telenovelas
2016 Brazilian television series debuts
2017 Brazilian television series endings
Portuguese-language telenovelas